Ayaz Nizami is a blogger and political prisoner in Pakistan known for his arrest on 24 March 2017 for alleged blasphemy, and is currently facing the death penalty on such charges.

Biography

Early life 
Nizami is a religious scholar, who primarily specialises in Islamic law such as "tafsir, Hadiths, Fiqh and their principles"; besides this, he is an expert in Arabic language, grammar, terminology, philosophy and rational thinking. He received his religious education after completing the standard education and was admitted to a religious school.

Activism 
Before his arrest, he allegedly translated materials critical of Islam in English to Urdu for publishing, and was first exposed by Alyan Khan, a Pakistani political author.  Nizami founded the website realisticapproach.org, a website in Urdu about irreligion, and allegedly served as the vice president of the Atheist & Agnostic Alliance Pakistan.

Arrest 
On 24 March 2017, Nizami was arrested for alleged blasphemy by the FIA, and agencies in Pakistan. Two other bloggers were arrested along with Nizami in a crackdown on social media content deemed blasphemous by the Pakistani government.  After his arrest, the hashtag #hangayaznizami  and #FreeAyazNizami was trending on Twitter in Pakistan, and authorities shut down his social media account over material deemed controversial.

See also 
 Freedom of religion in Pakistan 
 Political repression of cyber-dissidents

References 

People convicted of blasphemy in Pakistan
Pakistani bloggers
Living people
Critics of Islam
Pakistani atheists
Pakistani former Muslims
21st-century atheists
Year of birth missing (living people)
Place of birth missing (living people)
Internet censorship in Pakistan